Rose madder can mean:

Rose madder, a pinkish color made from madder pigment or dye
Rose Madder (novel), a 1995 novel by Stephen King

See also
Madder
Madder Rose